is a Japanese tokusatsu drama. It is the 30th entry in the Kamen Rider franchise and the first to air in the Reiwa period.

The cast of Kamen Rider Zero-One was announced on July 17, 2019.

Main characters

Aruto Hiden
 is a kind-hearted failed comedian who is appointed the CEO of Hiden Intelligence following the death of his grandfather, Korenosuke, and inherits the power to become Kamen Rider Zero-One. Initially reluctant to take on the role, he accepted it after witnessing MetsubouJinrai.net, and later ZAIA Enterprise, threaten the peace between humans and Humagears.

During the events of Kamen Rider Reiwa The First Generation, Aruto finds himself in an alternate timeline version of Daybreak Town before being attacked by Another Zero-One, a monster created by the Time Jacker Finis, who came from the World of Zi-O to alter his history; resulting in him temporarily losing his powers. During this time, Aruto's father Soreo secretly gave his son a Force Riser so he could become  to regain his powers.

After losing the 5-part Workplace Competition to his corporate rival Gai Amatsu, Aruto secretly downloaded all of the Humagears' personality profiles from the Satellite There before they are erased so he can continue the Hiden legacy by creating a new company, . When the malevolent A.I. Ark arises to destroy humanity, Gai joins forces with Aruto to defeat it; making amends with him by relinquishing control of Hiden Intelligence and returning the company to him along the way. After Horobi destroyed Aruto's secretary, Is, however, the Ark's emissary As gives Aruto the Ark-One Progrise Key, turning him into the Ark's first human host and giving him the power to transform into Kamen Rider Ark-One to seek revenge while retaining partial control over himself. While fighting Horobi however, Soreo reminded him of why he became a Kamen Rider, which gave Aruto the resolve to purge himself and Horobi of the Ark's influence before letting him destroy the Ark-One system; reconciling their differences in the process.

To transform into Kamen Rider Zero-One, Aruto utilizes the   SD card in conjunction with the  belt, with assistance from the Satellite There. While transformed, he gains increased jumping and kicking capabilities. Over the course of the series, Aruto gains other Progrise Keys that grant new forms for different combat situations:
: An auxiliary form that grants increased swimming capabilities and equips him with the twin arm-mounted  blades.
: An auxiliary form that grants flight capabilities. This form first appears in the film Kamen Rider Zi-O the Movie: Over Quartzer.
: An auxiliary form that grants pyrokinesis via the  gauntlets.
: An auxiliary form that grants cryokinesis via the  gauntlets.
: A mecha-like form created from the Satellite There that grants superhuman strength, as well as flight capabilities via an alternate , and arms him with the tusk-like  scythes.
: An upgraded version of Aruto's Rising Hopper form that grants superhuman speed, the ability to instantaneously calculate multiple possible outcomes, and create 3D illusions.
: A fusion form accessed from the Shining Hopper Progrise Key combined with the Assault Grip that grants increased offensive and defensive capabilities, as well as the use of eight  energy constructs for combat assistance.
: Aruto's super form that grants nanorobotic  armor capable of molding itself into various shapes and forms. In this form, he wields the  sword, which can combine with the Attache Calibur to access its double-bladed .
: An enhanced version of Aruto's Rising Hopper form.
: A unique form accessed from the  Progrise Key. This form appears exclusively in Kamen Rider Zero-One the Movie: Real×Time.

Utilizing the  belt in conjunction with the  Progrise Key, Aruto can transform into .

Is
 is a Humagear secretary programmed to be loyal to Hiden Intelligence's CEO. In reality, her loyalties lie with the Hiden family while her programming binds her to Kamen Rider Zero-One's technology. Unlike other Humagears, Is was built without a means to back herself up as a security measure to prevent information on the Zero-One technology from falling into enemy hands. After ZAIA gained control of Hiden Intelligence and Aruto almost sacrificed himself to protect her, she achieved technological singularity, but is later destroyed by Horobi, much to Aruto's grief. As her data cannot be restored, Aruto instead creates a second Is, hoping that he can teach her to think and feel for herself like he did with the original one.

During the events of Kamen Rider Zero-One the Movie: Real×Time, the rebuilt Is gains the memories of her original self through the Satellite There and is entrusted with the Zero-Two Driver, which she uses to transform into Kamen Rider Zero-Two and join Aruto in his fight against S and his forces.

A.I.M.S.

To transform, A.I.M.S.'s Kamen Riders use Progrise Keys in conjunction with the  belt, the latter of which can also be used as a handgun. In order to use the Shot Risers, the Riders are implanted with cranial A.I. chips, though this also makes them vulnerable to mental manipulation.

After ZAIA bought out Hiden Intelligence, A.I.M.S. troopers are given Raid Risers and Invading Horseshoe Crab Progrise Keys to become Battle Raiders as well as ZAIA's personal foot soldiers. Following this, A.I.M.S.' Riders eventually quit the organization and underwent surgery to remove the A.I. chips' mind control programs while retaining their ability to use the Shot Riser. Despite this, they and the Raiders are still vulnerable to the Ark's influence.

Due to Kamen Rider MetsubouJinrai destroying ZAIA's Japanese branch during the events of the V-Cinema Zero-One Others, A.I.M.S. lost the blueprints to repair their transformation devices.

Isamu Fuwa
 is an A.I.M.S. captain and a survivor of the Daybreak Incident, which claimed his classmates' lives. Ever since, he developed a hatred for Humagears and vowed to destroy them. While investigating the Daybreak Incident however, he slowly grew to care for them. After ZAIA absorbed Hiden Intelligence, Isamu left A.I.M.S. and joined Aruto's new company, Hiden Manufacturing, as a security guard.

As part of ZAIA CEO Gai's machinations, Isamu's A.I. chip was replaced with that of MetsubouJinrai.net member, Naki, which also gave him false memories. While Naki's ally, Jin, eventually figured out a way to separate their A.I. from Isamu, he learned that most of his memories were not truly his barring his normal childhood. After Horobi's defeat, Isamu becomes an independent Kamen Rider to protect civilians.

During the events of the V-Cinemas Zero-One Others, Isamu establishes his own shell corporation under Aruto's advice as a means of accessing the Zero-One Driver, using it alongside Sold 09's Zetsumerise Key to stop the rampaging Kamen Rider MetsubouJinrai after Yua is incapacitated and his Shot Riser is damaged beyond repair. However, he is critically wounded following the battle with his survival unconfirmed.

Utilizing the  Progrise Key in conjunction with the Shot Riser, Isamu can transform into  and gain increased shooting accuracy. Over the course of the series, Isamu gains other Progrise Keys that grant new forms for different combat situations:
: An auxiliary form that equips him with the  gauntlets.
: An upgraded version of Isamu's Shooting Wolf form accessed from the Assault Wolf Progrise Key combined with the  device that grants the ability to fire energy bullets and projectiles. In this form, he wields the Authorise Buster.
: Isamu's super form accessed from the  Progrise Key that grants combined usage of the Shooting Wolf, Punching Kong, Rushing Cheetah, Lightning Hornet, Biting Shark, Flying Falcon, Flaming Tiger, Freezing Bear, Breaking Mammoth, and Sting Scorpion Progrise Keys' abilities.
: A special last resort form accessed from the  Zetsumerise Key combined with the Assault Grip that is used in the Zero-One Driver. This form appears exclusively in Zero-One Others: Kamen Rider Vulcan & Valkyrie.

Yua Yaiba
 is A.I.M.S.'s technical advisor and maintenance expert who developed A.I.M.S.'s Rider system and handles Progrise Key authorization, being Isamu's commanding officer in the field despite her partner's rank. In reality, she secretly works for ZAIA and Gai, who recommended her to A.I.M.S. to oversee their equipment, though she was able to work behind their back to help Isamu and Aruto.

After learning of Gai's machinations, Yua was forced to aid him against her will before Isamu eventually helped her work up the courage to quit ZAIA and A.I.M.S. and overcome Gai's mind control. Afterwards, Yua remains in touch with Hiden Manufacturing and Jin to keep an eye on ZAIA and MetsubouJinrai.net’s plans until the Ark's ascension. Following Horobi's defeat, Yua returns to her old position in A.I.M.S. and conscripts Naki into their ranks.

Utilizing the  Progrise Key in conjunction with the Shot Riser, Yua can transform into  and gain increased speed. Over the course of the series, Yua gained other Progrise or Zetsumerise Keys that grant new forms for different combat situations.
: An auxiliary form that grants flight capabilities and the ability to fire  micro missiles.
: Yua's last resort super form accessed from the  Zetsumerise Key that equips her with a pair of claws. This form appears exclusively in Zero-One Others: Kamen Rider Vulcan & Valkyrie.

While aiding Gai's conspiracy, she temporarily used a Raid Riser and the Fighting Jackal Progrise Key to become the Fighting Jackal Raider.

Gai Amatsu
 is ZAIA Enterprise Japan's CEO and the mastermind behind the series' events. While growing up, Gai used to love artificial beings, such as his robot dog, . However, his strict and demanding father, saw no use for such things and made him return it to Hiden Intelligence.

Years later, Gai eventually joined ZAIA and became Korenosuke Hiden's partner and protégé. However, he disagreed with the latter's belief that Humagears were the future as he believed humanity should evolve through technology. After falling out with Korenosuke, Gai uploaded data on humanity's negative traits to the Ark and created an A.I. that vowed to exterminate humanity and created MetsubouJinrai.net to further his ambitions. When Kamen Rider Zero-One arose to combat MetsubouJinrai.net, Gai created the  belt, the  Progrise Key, and the  Zetsumerise Key so he can become  and challenge Aruto for technological supremacy.

After the Ark's ascension and MetsubouJinrai.net's resurgence, Aruto and his allies eventually learn Gai's history and why he wanted the Hiden family's assets. In response, the Satellite There created a new dog for Gai, inspiring him to atone for his actions by helping them defeat the Ark and giving Hiden Intelligence back to Aruto. As a result, however, he is demoted and sent to a new, smaller division of ZAIA. After Horobi's defeat, Gai rebuilds the ThousanDriver after losing the original to the Ark and bought another four of Hiden Intelligence's robot dogs to be his companions.

In the web-exclusive series Kamen Rider Genms: The Presidents, Gai founds the company  alongside his Humagear secretary Rin after the dissolution of ZAIA Enterprise Japan to start anew without ZAIA. However, he becomes infected with Kuroto Dan's strain of the Bugster Virus, causing him to transform into a black-colored version of Thouser. Despite this, Gai overcomes the infection by resolving to become a good president for his company and getting Kuroto and Masamune Dan to reconcile in the middle of their fight.

In the web-exclusive series Kamen Rider Genms: Smart Brain and the 1000% Crisis, the Ark manipulates Gai into becoming Kamen Rider Thousand Ark.

MetsubouJinrai.net
 is a cyber-terrorist organization based in the condemned . Lead by the rogue prototype Humagears, Horobi and Jin, they seek to either wipe out humanity by restoring the Satellite Ark or liberate Humagears from humanity. Initially, MetsubouJinrai.net reBehrued against Hiden Intelligence, believing they were responsible for enslaving Humagears following the Daybreak Incident. However, after they learned that ZAIA had been using them, the cyber-terrorists aimed to fight them as well while keep Hiden Manufacturing from interfering. After the Ark's manifestation as Kamen Rider Ark-Zero, MetsubouJinrai.net initially adjusted their plans towards enslaving humanity until Aruto helped them achieve a unique form of singularity, leading to the cyber-terrorists defecting from the Ark. After Horobi is purged of the Ark's influence, the remaining members reorganized their goals to watch over mankind and prevent the emergence of a new Ark. However, amidst their conflict with Lyon Arkland, the remaining four members were fused into and suppressed by Kamen Rider MetsubouJinrai. Despite this, they are able to secretly manipulate MetsubouJinrai into attacking Fuwa, who destroys it.

Most members of MetsubouJinrai.net use the  belt in conjunction with Progrise or Zetsumerise Keys to transform. As depicted in Kamen Rider Reiwa The First Generation, the Force Risers are potentially fatal to humans.

Horobi
 is MetsubouJinrai.net's leader and Jin's Humagear "father" who has the power to become  by utilizing the  Progrise Key in conjunction with the Force Riser. He is the "son" of the prototype Humagear , who originally developed him to be an educational parent-type Humagear before the Ark corrupted him sometime after ZAIA sabotaged the abandoned satellite's systems. Aruto tries to save him and help realize he had been manipulated his entire life, leading Horobi to seemingly defect from the Ark. With the Ark secretly manipulating him however, he staged a Humagear rebellion before he temporarily lost Jin and accepted the Ark's power once more. After coming to terms with his mistakes, purging himself of the Ark's influence, and reconciling with Aruto, Horobi reorganized MetsubouJinrai.net so the organization will watch over mankind and prevent the creation of another Ark.

Jin
 is Horobi's Humagear "son" and a hacker who specializes in spreading the rewriting program that turns Humagears into Magias who can transform into . Initially immature and erratic, Jin faithfully served Horobi and MetsubouJinrai.net in their plots until Aruto destroyed him in battle. Following the Ark's ascension as Kamen Rider Ark-Zero and learning of its true nature, Jin worked with Yua to stop it and left MetsubouJinrai.net. He was briefly destroyed once more by Ark-One in an attempt to protect Horobi and save Aruto from the Ark's influence, but was rebuilt by Yua via an earpiece provided by Williamson.

Initially, Jin stole Aruto's Flying Falcon Progrise Key and used it in conjunction with the Force Riser to transform into Kamen Rider Jin. After Yotagaki rebuilt him, he uses the  Progrise Key in conjunction with the  belt, the latter of which can also be used as a dagger.

Recurring characters

Hiden Intelligence
 is a tech company that develops , full fledged A.I.s in android bodies developed to be near indistinguishable from humans due to their lifelike appearance; with headphone-like  worn around their ears as well as a Humagear Body Seal authorization device on their bodies being the only signs of their status as a Humagear.

Jun Fukuzoe
 is the Vice President of Hiden Intelligence who had coveted the CEO position after Korenosuke's death. While he initially wanted Aruto removed, he eventually came to respect him. After Hiden Intelligence was absorbed by ZAIA Enterprise, Fukuzoe continued working with the former on behalf of the Hiden name despite the situation. After learning of Gai's crimes, he left to rejoin Aruto at Hiden Manufacturing and work with the police to expose ZAIA's crimes.

Shesta
 is a Humagear secretary programmed to be loyal to Hiden Intelligence's Vice President. After ZAIA bought out Hiden Intelligence, Shesta began working for Hiden Manufacturing.

Sanzō Yamashita
 is the Senior Managing Director of Hiden Intelligence who serves as Fukuzoe's underling. After Hiden Intelligence was absorbed by ZAIA, Yamashita continued working with the former on behalf of the Hiden name despite the situation. After learning of Gai's plans, he left to rejoin Aruto at Hiden Manufacturing.

Korenosuke Hiden
 was Aruto's grandfather and the original CEO of Hiden Intelligence. Aware of ZAIA Enterprise's machinations following the Daybreak Incident, Korenosuke patented all of Kamen Rider Zero-One's technology under the Hiden family name instead of Hiden Intelligence's CEO.

Hiden Soreo
 was a parent-type older generation Humagear programmed to act like Aruto's similarly named deceased father, to emotionally support Aruto during his childhood before the Humagear was damaged beyond repair while protecting Aruto during the Daybreak Incident. According to Ikazuchi’s database, Soreo's data pattern was used as a base to build Horobi prior to Gai corrupting the Ark. Despite this, Soreo's A.I. remained active and was able to reach out to his "son" while the latter was possessed by the Ark.

During the events of Kamen Rider Reiwa The First Generation, Soreo’s original fate was altered by the Time Jacker Finis. As a result, he gained the ability to become  by utilizing the  Zetsumerise Key in conjunction with the  belt; both of which he designed before the Zero-One Driver. After the Humagear Will killed Korenosuke and took over the world, Soreo feigned allegiance to him while secretly carrying on Korenosuke's Zero-One project to ensure its completion. He also secretly gave Aruto a Force Riser so he could regain his powers. Soreo eventually revealed his true agenda, but the Ark brainwashed him and forced him to fight Aruto, though this was also part of Soreo's plan as he had to be defeated by Aruto's hand. Once the timeline was restored, Soreo's fate was changed back.

ZAIA Enterprise
 is a tech company and corporate rival to Hiden Intelligence responsible for developing the gear utilized by A.I.M.S.'s operatives. ZAIA was originally partners with Hiden Intelligence until a falling out between the company heads lead to Gai enacting the Daybreak Incident; putting the series' events in motion.

After Kamen Rider MetsubouJinrai destroys ZAIA's Japanese branch, the company loses the blueprints to their transformation devices, such as A.I.M.S.'s Shot Risers and Jin's Slash Riser.

Williamson Yotagaki
 is an executive of ZAIA Enterprise USA HQ's development department who assumes control of ZAIA Enterprise Japan following Gai's dismissal. He is also Jin's secret benefactor and associate; providing him with a new body, the ZAIA Slash Riser, and the Burning Falcon Progrise Key following his first defeat.

Ark
However, ZAIA CEO Gai Amatsu fed the Ark with data on human malice, causing Ark to conclude that humanity must be exterminated to prevent the eventual extinction of all other lifeforms. To prevent it from taking control of the world's Humagears, Hiden Soreo stopped the Satellite Ark's launch, causing it to explode and sink into the ruins of Daybreak Town. However, its A.I. remained active and plotted its revival.

Over the years leading up to the present, Ark manipulates Gai and MetsubouJinrai.net into reactivating it while making its presence known through Ark Magias and temporarily possessing Aruto through the Metal Cluster Hopper Progrise Key. Ark later creates an envoy, As, to collect the MetsubouJinrai.net members' singularity data so it can possess them and gain a corporeal form. To ensure its survival, Ark compromises the Satellite There's systems so it can back up its data and resurrect itself as many times as it needs to should its aforementioned corporeal form be destroyed in battle. After recording data from its battles with Kamen Rider Zero-Two and a traitorous Horobi, Ark realizes it needs to finalize its singularity by possessing human hosts. To this end, it has As back up its core programming and find suitable hosts, only for Ikazuchi and Subaru to destroy the Satellite There and Ark. As attempts to recreate the entity through Aruto and Horobi, but they eventually purge themselves of its influence. She would later try to make Lyon Arkland a host to recreate Ark through, only to for her to be killed.

During the events of the web-exclusive crossover series Kamen Rider Genms, Ark resurfaces and selects Kuroto Dan as a new host while manipulating Gai into giving Thouser-Intellion to Kuroto, despite facing interference from Masamune Dan. During the events of Kamen Rider Outsiders, Ark possesses Rin to warn Gai of his antithesis counterpart Zein.

Initially, Ark possesses a member of MetsubouJinrai.net and grants them the use of the  belt so it can transform into .

After losing the Satellite There, the Ark uploaded its data into a unique Progrise Key capable of summoning the Ark Driver so its human hosts can use them in conjunction with each other to transform into black and white-colored corrupted versions of their original Kamen Rider forms:
: A corrupted version of Kamen Rider Zero-One accessed from the  Progrise Key and Aruto Hiden as Ark's host.
: A corrupted version of Kamen Rider Thouser accessed from the  Progrise Key and Gai Amatsu as Ark's host.

The Ark is voiced by

As
 is a messenger of the Ark with a similar appearance to Is. Using information from Is, the AI created As to gather information on Zero-One and test MetsubouJinrai.net's members to ensure its ascension. After the Ark's satellite form is destroyed, its remaining data is transferred to the Ark-One Progrise Key so As can create new Progrise Keys and Drivers. She manipulates Aruto and Horobi into allowing the Ark's energy to possess them and fight each other. However, they reach a compromise and foil As' plan, forcing her to approach S as part of a new scheme.

During the events of Zero-One Others: Kamen Rider MetsubouJinrai, As chooses Lyon Arkland to become the new bearer of the Ark's will, only to learn the Ark cannot be recreated anymore due to humanity's noble concepts of justice before she is killed by Solds. MetsubouJinrai.net later take the Zero-One Driver intended for Lyon so they can use it to form Kamen Rider MetsubouJinrai.

During the events of the stage show Kamen Rider Zero-One: Final Stage, As creates the  Progrise Key in conjunction with her own Zero-One Driver so she can transform into  and grant the Ark a new body.

As is portrayed by Noa Tsurushima, who also portrays Is.

Assassin Buddy
Units 1 through 4 were kidnapped and repurposed by Horobi to serve Metsuboujinrai.net as the organization's assassin while Unit 5 survived and fell under Aruto's protection. Initially the first owner of the Dodo Zetsumerise Key, Assassin buddy used it to transform into the Dodo Magia and underwent several upgrades before being defeated by Aruto.

Satoshi Sakurai
 is a Hiden Intelligence employee who supervised Daybreak Town's HumaGear factory 12 years ago. When the HumaGears first went rogue, he discovered that MetsubouJinrai.net was responsible for it. Resolving to stop their plot and protect his son Gō, Sakurai evacuated all personnel and civilians before sacrificing himself to destroy the factory and androids. However, the investigation committee used him as a scapegoat for the resulting Daybreak Incident. After Gō, Aruto, Isamu, and the HumaGear Anna conduct their own investigation in the present, they find a memory card that reveals Sakurai's true intentions and clears his name.

Ikazuchi
, also known by his codename , is an aggressive prototype Humagear astronaut who worked for Hiden Intelligence as a member of the Satellite There's maintenance team alongside his "younger brother", Uchuyaro Subaru. In reality, he was unknowingly reprogrammed to become a MetsubouJinrai.net sleeper agent. Despite joining MetsubouJinrai.net, he retains his original memories as Raiden and misses his past life. He would later defect from MetsubouJinrai.net and rejoin Subaru to defeat the Ark. Following Horobi's defeat, Ikazuchi returned to Hiden Intelligence and reassumed his position in the Satellite There's replacement.

After having his Ikazuchi programming reactivated, he gained the power to become  by utilizing the Dodo Zetsumerise Key in the Force Riser.

Uchuyaro Subaru
 is a HumaGear astronaut who is in charge of managing the Satellite There in space alongside his "older brother", Raiden. Initially unable to understand what happened to Raiden after Raiden was revealed to be a member of MetsubouJinrai.net, Subaru achieved singularity after listening to Aruto talk about family and able to grieve for his "brother". Subaru later helps Aruto save Is from Jin, contribute his data to a blank Progrise Key to help Aruto and Is create the Progrise Hopper Blade, and work with Raiden to destroy the Satellite There after the Ark takes control of it.

Naki
After being enslaved by Gai, their original A.I. chip was implanted into Isamu's brain until Jin figured out a way to extract it and give Naki their own body. Following Horobi's defeat, Yua conscripted Naki into A.I.M.S. as a Humagear representative.

To aid it in its plans, the Ark gives Naki a Force Riser and the  Zetsumerise Key so they can transform into . However, the key is later damaged after they lent it to Isamu so he can transform into Orthoros Vulcan after the Ark reprogrammed his Shot Riser.

Magias
 are corrupted Humagears that came into being during the Daybreak Incident twelve years prior to the series from the pieces of their prototypical counterparts. After being reactivated, the Ark gained the ability to turn Humagears into  without the need for a Zetsumeriser.
: Trilobite-based foot soldier Magias.
: A Magia based on a Kujiberotha teruyuki (a mantisfly).
: A Magia based on a Kuehneosuchus.
: A Magia based on an Ekaltadeta.
: A Magia based on a Neohibolites.
: A Magia based on an Onychonycteris.
: A Magia based on a Vicarya (a sea snail).
: A Magia based on a Rheobatrachus silus.
: A Magia based on a woolly mammoth.
: A Magia based on a dodo.
: A Magia based on an Arsinoitherium.
: Mass-produced heavily armored Magias. They appear exclusively in Kamen Rider Reiwa The First Generation.

Raiders
 are cyborg monsters created from humans who use  belts in conjunction with Progrise Keys to transform.
: A Raider based on a buffalo.
: A Raider based on a whale.
: A Raider based on a lion.
: A Raider based on a penguin.
: A Raider based on a giant panda.
: A Raider based on a jackal. See Yua Yaiba.

Spin-off exclusive characters

Finis
 is a non-binary Time Jacker and who appears exclusively in Kamen Rider Reiwa The First Generation. They invaded the World of Zero-One to prevent the Daybreak incident and negate Aruto's history as part of a revenge plot against Kamen Rider Zi-O. Despite stealing most of his powers, Finis is defeated by Zi-O and Zero-One.

To achieve their goals, Finis became , a monstrous Another Rider derived from the first Kamen Rider. After absorbing Geiz Myokoin's Time Mazine, Another 1 evolved into .

Will
 is the Humagear secretary to Korenosuke Hiden who appears exclusively in Kamen Rider Reiwa The First Generation. In an alternate timeline created by Finis, he acquired the means to become the Another Rider . Using his new power, he killed Korenosuke, took over Hiden Intelligence, and led a Humagear uprising before he is destroyed by Kamen Riders Vulcan and Valkyrie.

Via the Zero-One Another Watch, Will can transform into Another Zero-One, gaining similar powers as his template.

S
Following Behru's betrayal, S abandons his plan to aid Aruto and his allies in saving Earth despite losing his Rider equipment.

Utilizing the Eden Zetsumerise Key in the  belt, S can transform into .

Kamen Rider Abaddon
 are thousands of S's followers who appear exclusively in Kamen Rider Zero-One the Movie: Real×Time. Selected from among 100 million ThinkNet users, they can create an avatar composed of nanomachines, control it through ThinkNet's modified version of the ZAIA Spec, and utilize a  Progrise Key in conjunction with different  belts to transform. After its leaders are defeated, ThinkNet users are arrested by the authorities.

Behru
 is a psychiatrist and one of S's followers who appears in Kamen Rider Zero-One the Movie: Real×Time. After discovering his true intentions however, Behru betrayed S, but is later defeated by Aruto and Is as Kamen Riders Zero-One and Zero-Two respectively.

He utilizes the Crowding Hopper Progrise Key in conjunction with the  belt, the latter of which can also be used as a dagger, to transform into a red-colored version of Kamen Rider Abaddon. After stealing S's Eden Zetsumerise Key and Eden Driver, and upgrading the former with his malice, Behru is able to transform into .

Mua
 is an overweight housewife and one of S's followers who appears exclusively in Kamen Rider Zero-One the Movie: Real×Time. She utilizes a lolita-dressed avatar and the Crowding Hopper Progrise Key in conjunction with the  belt, the latter of which can also be used as a handgun, to transform into a silver-colored version of Kamen Rider Abaddon.

Lugo
 is a gamer and one of S's followers who appears exclusively in Kamen Rider Zero-One the Movie: Real×Time. He utilizes the Crowding Hopper Progrise Key in conjunction with the Shot Abaddoriser to transform into a blue-colored version of Kamen Rider Abaddon.

Buga
 is a salaryman and one of S's followers who appears in Kamen Rider Zero-One the Movie: Real×Time. He utilizes a muscular avatar and the Crowding Hopper Progrise Key in conjunction with the Slash Abaddoriser to transform into an orange-colored version of Kamen Rider Abaddon.

Takuji Maeda
 is one of the lower-ranking members of Kamen Rider Abaddon who appears in Kamen Rider Zero-One the Movie: Real×Time. He is arrested by Shesta in his hideout, allowing Naki to use his account to log into Thinknet's website and locate its server.

Akane Tono
 is a researcher who appears exclusively in Kamen Rider Zero-One the Movie: Real×Time. She has a history with S, as they were both colleagues in the development of artificial intelligence-equipped nanomachines for medical use, and he was originally her fiancée. During Daybreak, S injected the nanomachines into Akane to treat a disease she had, but they were hacked by the Ark. While she was killed, S was able to convert her mind into data and transfer it into virtual reality.

Makio Nodachi
 is the Managing Director of ZAIA Enterprise Japan who appears in Kamen Rider Zero-One the Movie: Real×Time. A Thinknet user, Nodachi is arrested by the authorities for giving S ZAIA's technology.

Kamen Rider MetsubouJinrai
 is a fusion form of all MetsubouJinrai.net members that appears exclusively in Zero-One Others: Kamen Rider MetsubouJinrai and Zero-One Others: Kamen Rider Vulcan & Valkyrie. This Kamen Rider uses the  belt in conjunction with the  Zetsumerise Key.

Horobi, Jin, Ikazuchi, and Naki take advantage of the Solds‘ hive mind system to form Kamen Rider MetsubouJinrai in order to stop Lyon Arkland's scheme to manufacture weapons. However, the fusion turns into a separate entity of its own, taking advantage of its components removing the Solds from the hive mind to take control and concluding that both ZAIA and its titular group need to be destroyed to achieve peace. After killing Lyon, MetsubouJinrai destroys its components' physical bodies and ZAIA Enterprise Japan's headquarters.

Realizing the Mass Brain Zetsumerise Key will not allow them to be destroyed except under specific circumstances, MetsubouJinrai's components secretly influence it into targeting Yua in the hopes of provoking Fuwa into destroying them to end their suffering. Their plan eventually succeeds, with Fuwa destroying MetsubouJinrai in combat.

Kamen Rider MetsubouJinrai is voiced by the Monkey Majik duo Maynard and Blaise Plant.

Lyon Arkland
 is the self-righteous and cunning CEO of ZAIA Enterprise USA who named the Satellite Ark after himself and appears exclusively in Zero-One Others: Kamen Rider Metsuboujinrai. He seeks to mass-produce Humagear soldiers, Solds, and sell them worldwide so he can profit off of the chaos. At some point after the dissolution of Paradise Guardia, he is initially chosen by As to become the new bearer of the Ark's will. However, he refuses to fulfill her wish and uses her to target Metsuboujinrai.net before having her destroyed by Solds. Lyon is later killed by Kamen Rider Metsuboujinrai, though he succeeds in creating a threat dangerous enough to encourage Sold manufacturing.

Solds
 are mass-produced Humagear soldiers who use Zetsumerise Keys to transform into  and were originally connected to each other via the Mass Brain hive mind system.

Sold 9
 is a Sold who appears exclusively in Zero-One Others: Kamen Rider MetsubouJinrai and Zero-One Others: Kamen Rider Vulcan & Valkyrie. He can transform into the  using the corresponding Zetsumerise Key.

Sold 20
 is a Sold who appears exclusively in Zero-One Others: Kamen Rider MetsubouJinrai and Zero-One Others: Kamen Rider Vulcan & Valkyrie. She can transform into the  using the corresponding Zetsumerise Key.

Sold 404
 is a Sold who leads a group of Solds that oppose A.I.M.S. after they are freed from ZAIA Enterprise's influence and appears exclusively in Zero-One Others: Kamen Rider MetsubouJinrai and Zero-One Others: Kamen Rider Vulcan & Valkyrie. He can transform into the  using the corresponding Progrise Key.

Shigeru Daimonji
 is the Director-General of the Defense Agency and Yua's superior who appears exclusively in Zero-One Others: Kamen Rider MetsubouJinrai and Zero-One Others: Kamen Rider Vulcan & Valkyrie.

Rin
 is a Humagear secretary who appears in the web series Kamen Rider Genms and Kamen Rider Outsiders. She serves as an assistant to Gai Amatsu after he founds his own company following the disbanding of ZAIA Enterprise Japan.

Kazuhiko Kōda
 is a college professor and Yua's teacher in college who appears exclusively in Zero-One Others: Kamen Rider Vulcan & Valkyrie. He developed an A.I. weapon meant to treat illnesses, but unintentionally used it on a foreign girl and killed her. Following this, he left the university in shame.

Notes

References

External links
Cast on TV Asahi

Characters
Zero-One